Gold monoiodide is the inorganic compound of gold and iodine with the formula AuI. It can be synthesized by dissolving gold powder in an aqueous solution of iodine and potassium iodide. With Lewis bases, AuI reacts to give numerous complexes.

References

Gold(I) compounds
Iodides
Metal halides
Gold–halogen compounds